The Lemuel and Mary James House was built c.1885 in James, Georgia in Jones County, Georgia.  It was listed on the National Register of Historic Places in 2013.

It is a two-story house with a covered porch wrapping around two sides.  It was deemed "significant in the area of architecture because it is an excellent and intact example of a Folk Victorian-style New South-type house."

The property has four contributing buildings in addition to the house:  a smoke house, a syrup house, a garage, and a storage barn.

References

External links

Houses on the National Register of Historic Places in Georgia (U.S. state)
Houses completed in 1810
National Register of Historic Places in Jones County, Georgia
Houses in Jones County, Georgia